The large fruit-eating bat (Artibeus amplus) is a species of bat in the family Phyllostomidae. It is found in the countries of Colombia, Guyana, and Venezuela. The large fruit-eating bat is one of only a few microbats that eats leaves (a behavior seen mostly in megabats).

References

Artibeus
Bats of South America
Mammals of Venezuela
Mammals of Colombia
Mammals described in 1987
Taxonomy articles created by Polbot